The Scotland A team are the second national rugby union team behind the Scottish national side. The first Scotland 'A' fixture took place in 1990.

History

Unlike association football, where the main team is supposed to be the "A" team, Scotland 'A' in rugby union is actually equivalent to the Scotland B football team. The Scotland 'A' side in rugby union is classed as a senior national side, along with the full national side and the Scotland 7s international side. When players play for any of these 3 senior sides; they commit their nationality to Scotland; and cannot then normally switch nationality to another international side. The parlance used deems these sides as 'capture' sides.

There was a history of national development sides in Scotland before the national 'A' side was introduced. The non-cap Scotland XV side started in 1969, the Scotland 'B' side introduced in 1971 was for uncapped players; and the start of the age-grade pathway sides - like the Under 21 side - which began in 1984.

Scotland XV, Scotland 'B' and age-grade sides
Scotland's status as one of the leading rugby nations in the Northern Hemisphere, made the SRU look to field a second team, first known as Scotland XV, which can play at the same level, sometimes even superior, of many second and third tier nations first sides. This team was a development side and players selected were not given caps and not tied to Scotland.

The Scotland XV first played in 1969, beating an Argentina side 20 - 3. These non-cap matches have proven controversial and there was a campaign to get players that were capped by the Scotland XV side as full caps. However the campaign failed; and these XV matches remain non-capped matches.

Scotland XV represented Scotland during the 1999 Rugby World Cup – European qualification, easily defeating Portugal by 85–11, and Spain by 85–3, in Murrayfield.

The launch of the Scotland 'B' side in 1971 provided uncapped players another route for recognition; this was a development side; no fully capped players were eligible. Like the Scotland XV side before it, this was not a 'capture' side.

The start of the Scotland age-grade teams in 1984 - on the launch of the national Under 21 side - were another pathway. Age-grade sides are not intended to be 'capture' sides; and their use as capture sides up to and including the Under 20 age-group range has now been banned by World Rugby.

Scotland 'A'

The 'A' side was launched as the second senior men's side in 1990, with the intention of giving a more formal step up to international rugby.

The Scotland 'A' side and Scotland 'B' side ran concurrently between 1990 and 1992; and are not regarded as similar. Indeed, players like Ian Corcoran, Douglas Wyllie and Damian Cronin have both Scotland 'A' and Scotland 'B' caps.

The 'A' side is used as an official 'capture' side for securing residency or otherwise qualified players for Scotland's international selection. Unlike the Scotland 'B' side there is no bar on fully-capped players playing for the 'A' side, although fully capped players are usually restricted to a few in the squad selection; primarily to provide leadership to the other players.

Before the professional era, Scotland 'A' played against touring national sides from the southern hemisphere.

Current squad

Gregor Townsend named a 23 man 'A' squad to face Chile on 25 June 2022.

Despite the history of rugby links between the two countries, this was the first ever rugby match between Scotland and Chile. 

Head Coach:  Gregor Townsend

Note: Bold denotes internationally capped players.

Competitions
They used to compete in the Churchill Cup alongside the full national teams of Canada and the United States as well as Ireland A, England Saxons, Argentina A and the New Zealand Māori.

They competed in the IRB Nations Cup, winning the competition in 2009 and ending last in 2010.

See also

Men's National teams

Senior
 Scotland national rugby union team
 Scotland national rugby sevens team

Development
 Scotland B national rugby union team
 Scotland Club XV

Age Grades
 Scotland national under-21 rugby union team
 Scotland national under-20 rugby union team
 Scotland national under-19 rugby union team
 Scotland national under-18 rugby union team
 Scotland national under-17 rugby union team
 Scotland national under-16 rugby union team

Women's National teams

Senior
 Scotland women's national rugby union team
 Scotland women's national rugby union team (sevens)

References

External links
 Scotland XV/A Official Games

Scotland national rugby union team
Second national rugby union teams